Low Worsall is a small village and civil parish in Hambleton district of North Yorkshire, England, near High Worsall and  west of Yarm.

References

External links

Villages in North Yorkshire
Civil parishes in North Yorkshire